"Walk Like a Man" is a song written by Don Brewer and Mark Farner and performed by Grand Funk Railroad.  It reached number 16 in Canada and number 19 on the Billboard Hot 100 in 1974.  It was featured on their 1973 album, We're an American Band.

The song and album were produced by Todd Rundgren. Rundgren recorded his own version of the song for his 2011 release, (re)Production, a compilation of re-recordings of songs he had produced for other bands.

Cash Box said that "the rock energy is high and perfectly carries the spirit of the group."

References

1973 songs
1973 singles
Grand Funk Railroad songs
Song recordings produced by Todd Rundgren
Capitol Records singles